Ruellia menthoides (syn. Dipteracanthus menthoides Nees, Eurychanes menthoides Hiern) is a plant native to the Cerrado vegetation of Brazil. This plant is cited in Flora Brasiliensis by Carl Friedrich Philipp von Martius.

External links
Flora Brasiliensis: Dipteracanthus menthoides

menthoides
Flora of Brazil